Upton National Forest was established in New York by the U.S. Forest Service on April 10, 1925, with  from part of the Upton Military Reservation. On June 29, 1927, the executive order for its creation was revoked and the forest was disestablished.

References

Former National Forests that were military bases
Former National Forests of New York (state)
Brookhaven, New York
1925 establishments in New York (state)
1927 disestablishments in New York (state)
Protected areas established in 1925